The Senate is the upper house of the Parliament of Cambodia. It is a legislative body composed of 62 members. Fifty-eight of the Senate seats are elected every six years by the commune councillors from 24 provinces of Cambodia and members of the National Assembly. In addition, the King nominates two senators, and the National Assembly nominates two, ending with a total of 62 senators. The Senate performs its duties as determined in the constitution and law in force. The Senate is chaired and presided by the president, currently Say Chhum of the Cambodian People's Party and assisted by two Vice Presidents.

The first Senate session was held on March 25, 1999, and the first election was held on January 22, 2006. The fourth and current Senate was inaugurated by King Norodom Sihamoni on April 23, 2018.

The next election is due to be held in 2024.

Term and session
Article 102:
The term of the Senate is six years and ends on the day when the new Senate takes office.

Article 107:
The Senate holds its ordinary sessions twice a year. Each session shall last at least three months. If requested by the king or Prime Minister, or at least one-third of all the senators, the Senate shall convene in an extraordinary session.

An absolute majority vote of all senators is used in the following cases:
Election of the President, Vice Presidents of the Senate and all members of the commissions or special commission
Adoption of organic laws
Adoption of the internal regulations of the Senate
Adoption of laws or issues

A two-thirds majority vote of all senators is used for the following cases:
Adoption of the Constitution law
The vote pertaining to the decision to indict, arrest, detent, confinement disciplinary action, parliamentary immunity, incompatibility, loss of membership, or abandonment of post.

A three-fourths majority vote of all senators is to be used to decide on the suspension of detention or indictment of any senator.

Leadership
The President of the Senate is assisted by two Vice Presidents who lead the Senate. If the President is unable to perform his/her duties due to illness or due to fulfilling the functions of Acting Head of State or as a Regent, or due to being on a mission abroad, a Vice President shall replace him. (Article 110-New of the Constitution)

The Permanent Committee of the Senate consists of:

The President of the Senate
Two Vice Presidents of the Senate
The Chairman of the nine Commissions of the Senate

Composition (elected seats)

Elections

2018

2012

List of senators in 2018

List of senators in 2012

See also
National Assembly (Cambodia)
Parliament of Cambodia
Politics of Cambodia
List of legislatures by country

References

External links
List of Senators
Ruling party wins Cambodia poll
Senate of the Kingdom of Cambodia
Senate Homepage
Official Results of the 2007 Commune Councils Election

1993 establishments in Cambodia
Cambodia
Parliament of Cambodia
Phnom Penh